"Hanging on the Telephone" is a song written by Jack Lee. The song was released in 1976 by his short-lived US West Coast power pop band The Nerves; in 1978, it was recorded and released as a single by American new wave band Blondie.

Blondie had discovered the song via a cassette tape compilation which Jeffrey Lee Pierce had given the band. Beginning with a phone sound-effect courtesy of producer Mike Chapman, Blondie's version of the song was released on the band's breakthrough third album, Parallel Lines. The single was a top five hit in the UK and has since seen critical acclaim as one of the band's best songs.

Background
"Hanging on the Telephone" was originally written by Jack Lee for his band, the Nerves. The song appeared as the lead-off track on the Nerves's 1976 EP; however, the release was a commercial failure and became the group's only release. Long after the song's eventual commercial success, Lee reflected "Even people who hated me – and there were plenty – had to admit it was great."

The song was later popularized by new wave band Blondie, who covered the track on their 1978 album, Parallel Lines. The band discovered the song after Jeffrey Lee Pierce of the Gun Club sent the band a cassette of the track. Blondie lead singer Debbie Harry explained:

Lee had been financially struggling at the time; he recalled the moment the band called him to ask permission to cover the song. "I remember the day vividly. It was a Friday. They were going to cut off our electricity at six o'clock, the phone too." The band also performed a version of the Lee-penned track, "Will Anything Happen", on Parallel Lines.

Blondie's version of the song begins with a sound effect of a telephone ringing. The idea was proposed by producer Mike Chapman; he recalled "The Blondies all thought that was stupid and too gimmicky, but I said, 'C'mon, guys! Gimmicky? This is Blondie. Let's give it a try! Like one of Blondie's subsequent singles, "Sunday Girl", "Hanging on the Telephone" employs a double backbeat rhythm in its drumming pattern, meaning the "off" beats alternate between a quarter note and two eighth notes. This percussion style also appeared on other power pop singles from the period, like the Romantics' 1978 release "Tell It to Carrie".

Release
Blondie released their cover of "Hanging on the Telephone" the second single from their 1978 album Parallel Lines in both the US and UK. The single failed to chart in the US, but it eventually reached number five in the UK in November 1978. Harry explained "Things take longer to catch on here [in the US]. Everything is really spread out and regional. I think the American people suffer from a lack of press. European press is very important. Here, television is what's important. Press makes more of an organized statement."

The single also was a moderate hit throughout Europe, reaching the top 20 in Ireland, Belgium, and the Netherlands.

Reception
Blondie's cover of "Hanging on the Telephone" has seen critical acclaim since its release, with several writers praising the song as an improvement on the original song. Rolling Stone called the song "immortal and breathless," while Tom Maginnis of AllMusic praised the song's "driving power and infectious melody." The Rolling Stone Album Guide named the song "a dynamic rock & roll opener," while Pitchfork praised the song as "incredible."  Cash Box said that it has a "fast clipping beat, varied guitar work and good lead vocals by Deborah Harry."  Record World called it a "fast-paced pop-rock gem with a good vocal."

The Independent named the song the third best Blondie song, writing "Blondie make this song their own by injecting a previously absent sense of urgency to the build, with Harry's tone developing from stern to desperate as she begs: 'Hang up and run to me. The Guardian ranked the song as the band's fourth best, calling the song "far superior" to the Nerves original and dubbing it "a massive power pop tune," while Ultimate Classic Rock ranked it as Blondie's seventh best, writing "Blondie retain the song's New Wave edge but sharpen the melody." Far Out Magazine and Paste both named the song as Blondie's eighth best, while The Telegraph and uDiscoverMusic both included the song in their unranked lists of Blondie's best songs.

Track listing
UK 7" (CHS 2266)
"Hanging on the Telephone" (Jack Lee) – 2:17
"Will Anything Happen" (Lee) – 2:55

US 7" (CHS 2271)
"Hanging on the Telephone" (Lee) – 2:17
"Fade Away and Radiate" (Chris Stein) – 3:57

Charts

Certifications

Other versions and appearances
Blondie re-recorded the song for the 2014 2-disc set Blondie 4(0) Ever.

In 2000, Finnish metal band Sinergy recorded a cover for their To Hell and Back album. In 2006, English rock band Def Leppard recorded own version for their cover album Yeah! In 2009, Jimmy Somerville covered the song on his acoustic album Suddenly Last Summer. In 2012, Flowers Forever covered the song for the movie Electrick Children. In 2017, Melissa Rauch covered the song as Harley Quinn in the animated film Batman and Harley Quinn.

References
Citations

Sources

External links
Classic Tracks: Blondie 'Hanging on the Telephone'

1976 songs
1978 singles
Blondie (band) songs
Chrysalis Records singles
American power pop songs
Song recordings produced by Mike Chapman
Songs about telephone calls
Songs written by Jack Lee (musician)